The Chatol House & Gardens also known as The Chatol, The White House or The Chance Guest House is a National Register historic mansion that has been restored to host memorable weddings and events.  Located in Centralia, Missouri, the home was built in 1940, as the private residence of F. Gano & Annie Chance.  The home is reflective of Streamline Moderne and International Style architecture.  The home measures approximately 136 feet by 92 feet with over 10,000 square feet of living space, including a large vaulted ballroom and furnishings from the 1933-34 World's Fair. It was constructed with steel footings on a concrete foundation, with a spring system employed in the walls.  The striking all white home includes many characteristics of Streamline Moderne/International Style architecture, including curved walls, port hole windows, horizontal ships banding and stair step elements throughout.  Today the home remains in the Chance family and is owned by Gil & Tam Stone. F. Gano Chance was the son of Albert Bishop Chance, inventor of the earth anchor, whose home and gardens are also on the National Register.

It was listed on the National Register of Historic Places in 1979.

References

Houses on the National Register of Historic Places in Missouri
Modernist architecture in Missouri
International style architecture in Missouri
Houses completed in 1940
Houses in Boone County, Missouri
Buildings and structures in Boone County, Missouri
Centralia, Missouri
National Register of Historic Places in Boone County, Missouri